Tropidothorax is a genus of seed bugs or ground bugs belonging to the family Lygaeidae, subfamily Lygaeinae.There are about 11 described species in Tropidothorax.

Species
These species belong to the genus Tropidothorax:
 Tropidothorax autolycus (Distant, 1904)
 Tropidothorax cruciger (Motschulsky, 1859)
 Tropidothorax elegans (Distant, 1883)
 Tropidothorax fimbriatus (Dallas, 1852)
 Tropidothorax leucopterus (Goeze, 1778)
 Tropidothorax maculatus (Dallas, 1852)
 Tropidothorax neocaledonicus Bergroth, 1909
 Tropidothorax sinensis (Reuter, 1888)
 Tropidothorax sternalis (Dallas, 1852)
 Tropidothorax villersi Slater & Wilcox, 1973
 Tropidothorax wittmeri Hamid & Hamid, 1985

References

External links

 BioLib
 Fauna Europaea
 

Lygaeidae